Chewing or mastication is the process by which food is crushed and ground by teeth. It is the first step of digestion, and it increases the surface area of foods to allow a more efficient break down by enzymes. During the mastication process, the food is positioned by the cheek and tongue between the teeth for grinding. The muscles of mastication move the jaws to bring the teeth into intermittent contact, repeatedly occluding and opening. As chewing continues, the food is made softer and warmer, and the enzymes in saliva begin to break down carbohydrates in the food. After chewing, the food (now called a bolus) is swallowed. It enters the esophagus and via peristalsis continues on to the stomach, where the next step of digestion occurs. Increasing the number of chews per bite increases relevant gut hormones. Studies suggest that chewing may decrease self-reported hunger and food intake. Chewing gum has been around for many centuries; there is evidence that northern Europeans chewed birch bark tar 9,000 years ago. 

Chewing, needing specialized teeth, is mostly a mammalian adaptation that appeared in early Synapsids, though some later herbivorous dinosaurs, since extinct, had developed chewing too. Nowadays, only mammals chew in the strict sense of the word, though some fishes have a somewhat similar behavior. Neither birds, nor amphibians or any living reptiles chew. 

Premastication is sometimes performed by human parents for infants who are unable to do so for themselves. The food is masticated in the mouth of the parent into a bolus and then transferred to the infant for consumption. (Some other animals also premasticate.)

Cattle and some other animals, called ruminants, chew food more than once to extract more nutrients. After the first round of chewing, this food is called cud.

Chewing is important and beneficial for  overall health. If food is not chewed correctly it can cause choking and other digestive problems.

Chewing motor program

Chewing is primarily an unconscious (semi-autonomic) act, but can be mediated by higher conscious input.  The motor program for mastication is a hypothesized central nervous system function by which the complex patterns governing mastication are created and controlled.

It is thought that feedback from proprioceptive nerves in teeth and the temporomandibular joints govern the creation of neural pathways, which in turn determine duration and force of individual muscle activation (and in some cases muscle fiber groups as in the masseter and temporalis).

This motor program continuously adapts to changes in food type or occlusion.  This adaptation is a learned skill that may sometimes require relearning to adapt to loss of teeth or to dental appliances such as dentures.

It is thought that conscious mediation is important in the limitation of parafunctional habits as most commonly, the motor program can be excessively engaged during periods of sleep and times of stress.  It is also theorized that excessive input to the motor program from myofascial pain or occlusal imbalance can contribute to parafunctional habits.

Muscles

Nutrition and health 

Chewing stimulates saliva production and increases sensory perception of the food being eaten, controlling when the food is swallowed. Evidence from one study suggests that chewing almonds 25-40 times kept people fuller while also allowing them to get more nutrients out of the almonds. The researchers also suggest that this is likely to be the case in other foods. Eating food which does not require chewing, by choice or due to medical reasons as tooth loss, is known as a soft diet. Such a diet may lead to inadequate nutrition due to a reduction in fruit and vegetable intake.

Chewing also stimulates the hippocampus and is necessary to maintain its normal function.

In other animals

Chewing is largely an adaptation for mammalian herbivory. Carnivores generally chew very little or swallow their food whole or in chunks. This act of gulping food (or medicine pills) without chewing has inspired the English idiom "wolfing it down".

Other animals such as cows chew their food for long periods to allow for proper digestion in a process known as rumination. Rumination in cows has been shown by researchers to intensify during the night. They concluded that cows chewed more intently in the night time compared to the morning.

Ornithopods, a group of dinosaurs including the Hadrosaurids ("duck-bills"), developed teeth analogous to mammalian molars and incisors during the Cretaceous period; this advanced, cow-like dentition allowed the creatures to obtain more nutrients from the tough plant life. This may have given them the advantage needed to compete with the formidable sauropods, who depended on their massive gastrointestinal tracts to digest food without grinding it, in their ecological niches. They eventually became some of the most successful animals on the planet until the Cretaceous–Paleogene extinction event wiped them out.

In machinery

The process of chewing has, by analogy, been applied to machinery. The U.S. Forest Service uses a machine called a masticator (also called a forestry mulching machine) to "chew" through brush and timber in order to clear firelines in advance of a wildfire.

A cold press juicer uses the mastication process to extract juice from fruit and vegetable without the loss of oxygen or heat-sensitive nutrients as there is less friction involved.

See also
Biting
Gnathology
Muscles of mastication
Horace Fletcher
Chewing Gum

Notes

External links

 

Dentistry
Digestive system
Articles containing video clips

sk:Žuvacie svaly